Chingudi jhola or chungudi jhola is a spicy gravy based prawn curry with different flavours of spices. It is mostly eaten by  people of the coastal regions and the areas of River basins of Odisha, India.

Preparation
The curry is prepared by frying the prawns in mustard oil, and then in a mixture of garam masala—including cinnamon. Bay leaves are also used when making the curry. Some variations of chungudi jhola include the use of coconut-cashew paste. The curry includes an abundance of tomato and garlic which gives the curry a reddish hue and spicy flavour.

References
chingudi jhola tarkari

South Asian curries
Odia cuisine
Indian seafood dishes